Gainneville is a commune in the Seine-Maritime department in the Normandy region in northern France.

Geography

Population

Places of interest
 The church of St.Pierre, dating from the sixteenth century.

Notable people
The professionnel footballers, Anthony Le Tallec and his brother Damien Le Tallec, are originally from Gainneville.

See also
Communes of the Seine-Maritime department

References

External links

Official website of the commune 
A website of the commune 

Communes of Seine-Maritime